Jarava pseudoichu is a species of grass in the family Poaceae, disjunctly distributed in Colombia, Venezuela, Bolivia and Argentina. As its synonym Stipa pseudoichu it has gained the Royal Horticultural Society's Award of Garden Merit as an ornamental.

References

Pooideae
Flora of Colombia
Flora of Venezuela
Flora of Bolivia
Flora of Northeast Argentina
Flora of Northwest Argentina
Plants described in 1997